Highway 612, known as the Springdale Northern Bypass is the temporary designation of the future U.S. Route 412 (US 412) bypass around Springdale in the U.S. state of Arkansas. It currently consists of a four-lane freeway from a temporary at-grade intersection with Highway 112 south of Cave Springs to an interchange with Interstate 49 (I-49) at Lowell.

Once completed, the highway is planned to act as a bypass of US 412 around Springdale, relieving traffic and improving travel between the city and Northwest Arkansas National Airport. The highway is planned to be a four-lane Interstate-standard divided freeway. Currently, there is no scheduled date for when the remaining highway sections will be built.

Route description 
, Highway 612 begins at a partially completed diamond interchange with Highway 112 within the city limits of Springdale signed as exit 9. The two halves of the roadway come together and become a four-lane freeway (two lanes in each direction) traveling east. The highway crosses over Spring Creek and passes to the north of a quarry. The freeway currently ends at a partially completed stack interchange with I-49 and US 71 just outside the limits of Lowell.

Once completed, Highway 612 is planned to run from an interchange with US 412 west of Tontitown to US 412 east of Sonora and just west of Beaver Lake. The route will run near the Northwest Arkansas National Airport and bypass Springdale to the north.

History 
Construction of the highway began in April 2015 after getting funding through a 10-year, half-cent sales tax generated from a 2012 vote.  The highway cost $100.6 million, and was the most expensive of 36 projects funded by the tax. The first  section was planned to be finished by mid-2019, but the entire route was completed a year ahead of schedule.  A ribbon-cutting ceremony was held on April 18, 2018, and the highway officially opened to traffic on April 30.  

On October 18, 2018, Highway 612 was designated the "Springdale Officer John T. Hussey Memorial Highway" in honor of the Springdale Police Department officer kidnapped and killed after a traffic stop on December 21, 1975.

Future 
The remaining portions of the highway have no set dates of completion, due to the need for funding and for the acquisition of land by ArDOT. As funding for the project becomes available, the highway will be completed in sections.

The portion of US 412 from I-49 in Springdale to I-35 in Noble County, Oklahoma is planned to become an interstate.

Exit list

See also

References

External links 

612
Transportation in Benton County, Arkansas